The 2017 European Pairs Speedway Championship was the 14th edition of the European Pairs Speedway Championship. The final was held in Lonigo, Italy on 30 September. 

The title was won by Poland for the sixth time.

Final

See also 
 2017 Speedway European Championship

References 

2017
European Championship Pairs
Speedway European Championship